Maa Pathrol Kali Temple (माँ पथरोल काली) is located in Madhupur, Deoghar in the Santhal Parganas division of the state of Jharkhand, India. It is roughly 7 km from the Madhupur Town. The temple consists of a shrine dedicated to Goddess Kali. It is one of the oldest and sacred temple in Madhupur which was built by Raja Digvijay Singh about 6 to 7 centuries ago. Worship is held every day from Monday to Sunday.  Animals are sacrificed as part of worship. There are nine more temple close to the main temple. An Annual fair is held every year during the month of Kartik (Oct.-Nov.) where thousands and thousands, of Pilgrims and devotees gather here for the worship and to witness the fair.

References 

Temples in Jharkhand
Deoghar district
Temples in India
Kali temples
Pilgrimage in India
Hindu temples
Hindu temple architecture